John Melvin may refer to:

John Melvin (architect) (born 1935), British architect, town planner, and author
John Melvin (engineer) (1938–2014) automotive safety engineer for General Motors and NASCAR
John Melvin (naval officer) (1887–1917), first American naval officer to die in World War I
John Melvin (rower), British lightweight rower